List of shark attacks in South African territorial waters.

List

See also

List of fatal shark attacks in South African territorial waters

References

External links
Go Shark: Shark Attacks in South Africa
Shark Attack Data: South Africa
Stop Shark Cage Diving
Shark.ca.za/Shark attack in South Africa today
Dispatch Online: South Africa's most dangerous shark attack beach?
ITN: Shark kills man in shallow water in South Africa

Disasters in South Africa
Shark attacks
Lists of animal fatalities